Spinal precautions, also known as spinal immobilization and spinal motion restriction, are efforts to prevent movement of the spine in those with a risk of a spine injury. This is done as an effort to prevent injury to the spinal cord. It is estimated that 2% of people with blunt trauma will have a spine injury.

Uses 
Spinal immobilization was historically used routinely for people who had experienced physical trauma. There is; however, little evidence for its routine use. Long spine boards are often used in the prehospital environment as part of spinal immobilization. Due to concerns of side effects the National Association of EMS Physicians and the American College of Surgeons recommend its use only in those at high risk. This includes: those with blunt trauma who have a decreased level of consciousness, pain or tenderness in the spine, those with numbness or weakness believed to be due to a spinal injury, and those with a significant trauma mechanism that are intoxicated or have other major injuries. In those with a definite spinal cord injury immobilization is also recommended.

Neck
There is little high quality evidence for spinal motion stabilization of the neck before arrival at a hospital. Using a hard cervical collar and attaching a person to an EMS stretcher may be sufficient in those who were walking after the accident or during long transports. In those with penetrating neck or head trauma spinal immobilization may increase the risk of death. If intubation is required the cervical collar should be removed and inline stabilization provided.

Mid and low back
Spinal motion stabilization is not supported for penetrating trauma to back including that caused by gun shot wounds.

Cervical spine clearance

Paramedics are able to accurately determine who needs or does not need neck immobilization based on an algorithm. There are two main algorithms, the Canadian C-spine rule and NEXUS. The Canadian C-spine rule appears to be better. However, following either rule is reasonable.

Side effects 

Concern with use include: pain, agitation, and pressure ulcers. A systematic review found cervical collar related skin ulcers from the devices in 7 to 38%.

If a longboard is used, cushioning it is useful to decrease discomfort due to pressure. A vacuum mattress and scoop board typically results in lower pressures.

Mechanism of action
Studies with volunteers have found that using a hard collar, head stabilization with rolled up towels, and a long board decrease movement of the board. What impact this has is unclear.

References 

First aid
Injuries
Vertebral column disorders